Brighton & Hove Albion Football Club is a professional football club based in the city of Brighton and Hove, East Sussex, England.

This list encompasses the records set by the club and players.

Team records

Record wins 
 14–2 v Brighton Amateurs, FA Cup Q1, 4 October 1902
 10–1 v Wisbech Town, FA Cup R1, 13 November 1965 (FA Cup)
 9–1 v Newport County, FL D3(S), 18 April 1951;
 9–1 v Southend Utd, FL D3, 27 November 1965 (Football League)

Record defeats 
 0–18 v Norwich City, wartime, 25 December 1940
 0–9 v Middlesbrough, FL D2, 23 August 1958 (Football League)

Streaks 
 Longest run unbeaten 22 games, May – December 2015

Player records

Goalscorers 
 Most goals in a season: Peter Ward, 36 goals (in the 1976–77 season)

Top Goalscorers 
Tommy Cook is officially recognised by the club as their top scorer with 123 goals in 209 appearances from 1922–1929.

Bert Stephens scored 174 goals between 1935–1948, however only 87 of these were scored in competitive matches. The remainder were scored during wartime fixtures when competitive football was suspended.

Competitive, professional matches only.

Most Appearances 
Ernie “Tug” Wilson has the most appearances for the club playing a total of 566 times from 1922–1936.

Highest transfer Fee Paid 
Brighton and Hove Albion's record signing is Enock Mwepu who signed for the club in July 2021 from Austrian club Red bull Salzburg for an undisclosed fee, reported to be £20.7m.

References

Records and statistics
Brighton and Hove Albion